Daisuke Masuda (益田 大介, born September 27, 1973) is a former Nippon Professional Baseball outfielder.

External links

1973 births
Living people
Baseball people from Hyōgo Prefecture
Japanese baseball players
Nippon Professional Baseball outfielders
Chunichi Dragons players
Osaka Kintetsu Buffaloes players
Tohoku Rakuten Golden Eagles players
Japanese baseball coaches
Nippon Professional Baseball coaches
People from Akashi, Hyōgo